Hondo is a 1953 Warnercolor 3D Western film directed by John Farrow and starring John Wayne and Geraldine Page. The screenplay is based on the 1952 Collier's short story "The Gift of Cochise" by Louis L'Amour. The book Hondo was a novelization of the film also written by L'Amour, and published by Gold Medal Books in 1953. The supporting cast features Ward Bond, James Arness and Leo Gordon.

The shoot went over schedule, and Farrow had to leave the production as he was contractually obligated to direct another movie. The final scenes featuring the Apache attack on the circled wagons of the Army and settlers were shot by John Ford, whom Wayne had asked to finish the film; Ford was uncredited for this work.

Plot summary
Homesteader Angie Lowe (Geraldine Page) and her 6-year-old son Johnny (Lee Aaker) are doing chores when Hondo Lane (John Wayne) arrives, carrying his saddle bags and rifle, accompanied by his dog Sam. He was riding dispatch for the US Army Cavalry, had an encounter with Indians and lost his horse.  Hondo offers to work for awhile to earn a horse and Angie agrees.  After Angie has said several times that her husband is simply away herding cattle, Hondo confronts her with evidence that he must have been gone a long time, judging by the condition of the ranch and horses.  He encourages her to pack up and return with him to the Army fort, since the treaty with the Apache has been broken and they are planning a war; Angie believes her long-standing friendship with the Apache will keep her safe.  That night, she notices Hondo's name on his rifle case and remembers hearing he killed three men.  She threatens him with an unloaded gun; he loads it for her.

As Hondo prepares to leave, he mentions that he once lived among the Apache and had an Apache wife.  He tells Angie that she reminds him of his wife and kisses her before he goes.  She is confused and upset because she is married, but Hondo insists that people ought to do what they feel is right.  He leaves for the fort.  Shortly thereafter, the Apaches come to the ranch, led by Chief Vittoro (Michael Pate) and Silva (Rodolfo Acosta).  When Vittoro touches Angie, Johnny gets the gun Hondo loaded and shoots at Silva.  Though he misses, Vittoro is impressed with his bravery and makes him a blood-brother.  Vittoro insists that a brave child should have a father, and leaves.

Hondo returns to the fort and sees Buffalo Baker (Ward Bond), a fellow scout. He reports to the major that C Troop was wiped out by Apaches and has an encounter with a settler angry that the cavalry is not better protecting the settlers. In a saloon, Hondo gets into a fight with the same settler. Baker later tells Hondo the man is "Ed Lowe" (Leo Gordon); who he realizes is Angie's absentee husband. Meanwhile, Vittoro, sure that Angie's husband is dead, gives her an ultimatum to take an Apache husband by the rainy season.

The next morning, Ed Lowe accuses Hondo of stealing his horse, seeing the "EL" brand.  His friends defend Hondo, who immediately leaves to return the horse to the ranch.  Upset about the fight and horse, Ed follows Hondo to bushwhack him.  While camped, Hondo is set upon by Apache, who also attack Ed.  In the confusion, Hondo saves Ed's life, but when he turns his back, Ed draws on him, and Hondo kills him.  He finds Ed was clutching a photograph of Johnny, which he takes.  In the ensuing chase, the Apache capture and torture Hondo for information about the cavalry's movements.  When Vittoro sees the photo of his blood-brother, he decides to subject Hondo to a one-on-one fight to the death with Silva, whose brother Hondo killed.  Hondo is victorious, but lets Silva live; the Apache drop Hondo off at the ranch, where Angie lies about him being her husband.

Hondo and Angie grow close as he recuperates. Hondo attempts to reveal the truth of her husband's death, but is interrupted by Vittoro's return. The chief tells them that the pony soldiers will soon come. He asks Hondo to mislead the cavalry as a test; Hondo refuses to lie, and Vittoro is satisfied.  Angie admits she loves Hondo and they kiss.  The next day, the cavalry arrive at the ranch and expect Angie to leave.  She and Hondo refuse.  While they camp, another scout blackmails Hondo for his Winchester rifle - he says he will tell Angie how Hondo killed Ed if he doesn't give him the rifle.  Hondo punches him, but Angie overhears.  The cavalry eventually leave and Hondo stays behind.

Hondo prepares to go, but first tells Angie the truth about her husband's death. He also wants to tell Johnny, but she persuades him not to, admitting that she did not love her husband any longer. She says it would be unkind to tell the boy the truth of his father's death and that the secret will not follow them to Hondo's ranch in California. Hondo responds to her emotional plea with an Indian word that seals an Apache wife-seeking ceremony, "Varlabania", which he tells her means "forever".

The cavalry return to the ranch, having killed Vittoro in a battle but having their commanding officer badly wounded.  While the Apache regroup, Hondo, Angie, and Johnny join the wagon train and head for the fort.  The Apaches catch up and the cavalry, led by Hondo, circle the wagons and counter-attack.  Hondo kills Silva (their new leader) and the Apache scatter, giving the settlers and soldiers a chance to escape.  The wagon train regroups and proceeds to the fort with Hondo remaining in command.

Cast

Filming locations
 San Francisco de Conchos. The exterior of the Church of San Francisco de Asís in the village was used for the army camp scenes.

Development and production
Wayne's newly formed production company Wayne-Fellows Productions (later Batjac) purchased the rights to Louis L'Amour's short story "The Gift of Cochise" in 1952, and set Wayne's friend and frequent collaborator James Edward Grant to write the adaptation, which expanded the original story, introduced new characters, and added the cavalry subplot. L'Amour was given the rights to write the novelization of the film, which became a bestseller after the film's release. The film shoot was scheduled for the summer of 1953 in the Mexican desert state of Chihuahua in the San Francisco de Conchos 
region. Today, this region is known for its tourist attractions like Lago Colina and spring pools like Los Filtros. It is a green area region with plenty of fishing and agriculture growth.

Wayne and his producing partner Robert Fellows wanted to shoot the film in the trend-setting 3D format. Warner Brothers supplied the production with the newly developed "All Media Camera," which could shoot in any format, including 3-D, using twin lenses placed slightly apart to produce the stereoscopic effect necessary for it. Despite the fact that they were smaller than the twin camera process used previously for 3D, the All-Media Cameras were still bulky and made the film shoot difficult, causing delays when transporting the cameras to remote desert locations. Further, the director John Farrow and director of photography Robert Burks were unfamiliar with the new technology and had trouble adjusting to using it, while the cameras were frequently broken due to wind blowing sand into the mechanism or from other inclement weather conditions. Farrow used the technology to produce fewer gimmicks than other 3D films did at the time, with only a few scenes showing people or objects coming at the camera, such as gunfire or knives. Instead he preferred to use it to increase the depth of the expansive wide shots of the Mexican desert, or when showing figures against a landscape.

The casting of Geraldine Page as the female lead was considered quite puzzling to many in Hollywood at the time. Though Hondo was not her first film, she had been known primarily as a Broadway stage actress and employed the Method acting style deemed by some to be too introspective for film, and especially for Westerns. However, she delivered a powerfully nuanced and original-feeling performance utterly appropriate to her character which later garnered her an Oscar nomination for Best Supporting Actress, the first of only two acting nominations ever for a film shot or presented in 3D. (The award went to Donna Reed for From Here to Eternity.) Page, one of the cinema's most acclaimed actresses, would receive seven Academy Award nominations during her four-decade career before winning the Academy Award for Best Actress in 1986 for The Trip to Bountiful.

John Ford shot the final scenes of the wagon train attack as a favor for Wayne when Farrow had to leave the film before its completion due to a conflicting contractual obligation to begin another film. Ford accepted no credit for directing the last sequence of the film.

John Wayne later said John Farrow "didn't really have a great deal to do with" the film. "Everything was set up before he came on it...It was written and I went out and looked for locations and picked the locations where each scene would be shot. I went back and brought the cameraman, and they said there's no color here. I said wait until I show you, and within seventeen miles of town I had white molten rock, blue pools of water, black buttes, big chalk-white buttes. We were using 3-D. We made it in 3-D but then it was never released in that, because Warner Brothers decided to give up and use the Fox system."

Theatrical release
Even with the production troubles that came with the location shooting in 3D, the studio thought it was a worthwhile venture since 3D pictures were at the height of popularity at the time of the film's development. However, by the time the film was completed, public interest in 3D had started to wane. The distributing studio Warner Brothers did everything it could to promote its new 3D camera process and how it went beyond the typical gimmicks used by other popular 3D films at the time such as House of Wax, producing a richer sense of perspective.

Hondo was released on November 27, 1953, and was presented in the 3D format in only extremely few if any theaters at the time; theaters were unable to show the film in the stereoscopic format because the Polaroid 3D projection system required a brighter and more light-reflective screen, referred to as a "silver screen," which was an added cost theater owners were reluctant to pay.

The film has an intermission, which comes right after Hondo is captured by the Apaches. This is included on the DVD version.

The film ended up becoming quite popular with audiences, eventually grossing $4.1 million at the box office and placing it in the top 20 money-makers for that year.

Restoration and DVD release
An initial restoration of Hondo was overseen by Wayne's son Michael, head of Batjac Productions, in the late 1980s culminating in a syndicated broadcast of the film in June 1991 on American over-the-air stations in anaglyph 3D. 3D glasses were sold to viewers, with proceeds going to charity.

A frame-by-frame digital restoration by Prasad Corporation of the film was later completed, and the DVD of it was released on October 11, 2005.

The 3D version of Hondo has yet to be released on either DVD or Blu-Ray.

A restored 3D theatrical version was exhibited for a week in 2015 at the Museum of Modern Art in New York City, and projected the following year at New York's Film Forum, introduced at both venues by Michael Wayne's wife Gretchen Wayne.

References in popular culture
Part of a 1988 episode of Married... with Children, titled "All in the Family", has Al Bundy readying himself to watch Hondo in peace during a three-day weekend, but Peggy's family comes to visit, and their ensuing problems prevent him from seeing the film, just as their antics prevented him from seeing Shane the previous year. A 1994 episode of Married... with Children, titled "Assault and Batteries", has a subplot in which Al is desperate not to miss a television airing of Hondo because, as he explains, it is the best John Wayne movie and it only airs "once every 17 years". Al does miss this airing at the end of the episode and will have to wait until February 18, 2011 to see it again. Al holds the film in very high esteem, once telling Peggy's family members "Your lives are meaningless compared to Hondo!"

Two later John Wayne Westerns contain subtle references to "Hondo." In Rio Lobo (1970), a wanted poster for Hondo Lane can be seen on a wall in the sheriff's office. In the 1973 film The Train Robbers, the chief male and female characters (played by Wayne and Ann-Margret) are Lane and Mrs. Lowe, the same names as in "Hondo".

In Men in Black 3 (2012), Agent K refers to Agent J as "Hondo" when J stares at him as he drives, "You lose something over here, Hondo?"

References

External links

 
 
 
 
 
 Screenshot of Hondo
 Larry Cohen on Hondo at Trailers from Hell

Films directed by John Farrow
1953 films
Batjac Productions films
Warner Bros. films
1953 Western (genre) films
1953 3D films
Films shot in Mexico
American Western (genre) films
Films produced by John Wayne
Films set in New Mexico
Films based on short fiction
Films scored by Emil Newman
Films scored by Hugo Friedhofer
American 3D films
Films based on works by Louis L'Amour
Revisionist Western (genre) films
1950s English-language films
1950s American films